Harry Haultain Badger (c. 1915 – July 14, 1998) was a Canadian football player who played for the Winnipeg Blue Bombers. He won the Grey Cup with them in 1939.

References

Canadian football running backs
Players of Canadian football from Saskatchewan
Winnipeg Blue Bombers players
1910s births
1998 deaths